KCTF-LP was a religious television station in Twin Falls, Idaho, broadcasting locally on channel 45. Founded May 10, 1999, the station was owned by Christian Broadcasting of Idaho, Inc.

KCTF-LP's license was cancelled by the Federal Communications Commission on August 4, 2021, due to the station not obtaining a license for digital operation by the July 13, 2021 deadline.

External links

Television stations in Idaho
Television channels and stations established in 2002
2002 establishments in Idaho
Defunct television stations in the United States
Television channels and stations disestablished in 2021
2021 disestablishments in Idaho
CTF-LP